This is a list of football (soccer) clubs in Slovakia.

Men's

Fortuna Liga 2020-21

The Fortuna Liga is the top flight of Slovakia′s football league system. Contested by 12 professional clubs, it operates on a system of promotion and relegation. Seasons typically run from August to May with each team playing 22 matches (playing all 11 other teams both home and away) in the round-robin format. After the finish, the league splits into top- (champions) and bottom- (relegation) 6 to play an extra home and away round. The teams keep all their points from the round-robin and play extra 10 matches to finish at 32 matches altogether.

The opening match of 2020-21 kicked off on August 8th, 2020 with Nitra (promotion play-off winner) hosting Slovan Bratislava (reigning champion). Most games are played on Saturday and Sunday afternoons. 

List of participants:

 ŠK Slovan Bratislava
 FC DAC 1904 Dunajská Streda 
 MŠK Žilina 
 FC Spartak Trnava
 FC ViOn Zlaté Moravce
 AS Trenčín
 ŠKF Sereď
 FK Pohronie Žiar nad Hronom Dolná Ždaňa
 MFK Ružomberok
 FC Nitra
 MFK Zemplín Michalovce
 FK Senica

2. Liga 2020-21

The 2nd league of Slovakia′s football pyramid is a national professional competition, which is contested by 16 clubs. At the end of the season, the top-finishing team is automatically promoted to the Fortuna Liga, the second-placed team plays against the eleventh-placed team of the Fortuna liga in two-legged play-offs (home and away). 

In summer 2020, MFK Ružomberok reserves team vacated the competition and have not been replaced. In the 2020-21 season, the league comprises an uneven number of 15 football teams. Over the course of a season, which runs typically from August to the following May, each team plays twice against the others, once at 'home' and once 'away', resulting in each team competing in 30 games in total. The opening match of 2020-21 kicked off on July 31st, 2020 with  Poprad hosting  Bardejov

The list of participants: 
  MFK Dukla Banská Bystrica
 MFK Tatran Liptovský Mikuláš
 FK Železiarne Podbrezová
 MFK Skalica
 FC Košice
 FC Petržalka
 MŠK Púchov
  MŠK Žilina B
 KFC Komárno
  Slavoj Trebišov
 FC ŠTK 1914 Šamorín
  Partizán Bardejov BŠK
  FK Dubnica nad Váhom
  ŠK Slovan Bratislava B
 FK Poprad

Women's

Slovak Women's First League
As of 2020–21 season:
Partizán Bardejov
Slovan Bratislava
MŠK Žilina
Spartak Myjava
FC Nitra
FC Petržalka
FC Spartak Trnava
AS Trenčín
FK Poprad
MFK Dukla Banská Bystrica

References

External links
 

 
Slovakia
clubs
Football clubs